Sérsekszőlős is a village in Tab District of Somogy County in Hungary.

External links 
 Street map (Hungarian)

References 

Populated places in Somogy County